Jean-Baptiste Bertrand (25 March 1823 Lyon - 26 Sept 1887 Orsay, Seine-et-Oise), was a French painter and lithographer. At first he was a student of Étienne Rey (1789–1867) and later of Jean-Claude Bonnefond (1796–1860) at the École des Beaux-Arts in Lyon from 1840 to 1843.

Alphonse P?rin (1798–1874) suggested that he move to Paris, where he enrolled at the École des Beaux-Arts in 1844 and had his first Salon exhibition in 1857. He spent 11 years working with P?rin and his teacher and friend Victor Orsel, decorating the chapel of the Eucharist in the Paris Church of Notre Dame de Lorette and in 1854 started work on reproductions of work by Orsel.

Bertrand travelled in Italy between 1857 and 1862. Returning to Paris, he befriended sculptors such as Jean-Baptiste Carpeaux, Alexandre Falguière and Auguste Clésinger. Influenced by his sculptor contacts, Bertrand devoted himself from 1866 to allegories and genre scenes, departing from his early Nazarene style. These were heroic depictions of the great heroines of history and literature, as in the Death of Sappho (1867), the Death of Virginie (1869), the Death of Manon Lescaut (1870) and the Death of Ophelia (1872). These works became widely known and popular through engravings.

Gallery

1823 births
1887 deaths
19th-century French painters
French male painters
19th-century French male artists